Po-Shen Loh (born June 18, 1982) is an American professor of mathematics at Carnegie Mellon University and the national coach of the United States' International Math Olympiad team. Under his coaching, the team won the competition in 2015, 2016, 2018, and 2019—their first victories since 1994. He had previously won a silver medal for the US as a participant in 1999. Loh runs a popular course to train students for the William Lowell Putnam Mathematical Competition known as Putnam Seminar and is the founder of the educational website Expii. He also teaches courses on discrete mathematics and extremal combinatorics at Carnegie Mellon. He graduated with honors from the California Institute of Technology with a B.S. in mathematics in 2004. He graduated with a 4.3 GPA and was ranked first in his graduating class at Caltech. After graduating from Caltech, Loh went on to study at Cambridge University on a Churchill Scholarship and received a MASt in mathematics with distinction in the year 2005. He then pursued graduate studies with the support of a Hertz Fellowship and a National Science Foundation Graduate Research Fellowship at Princeton University and received a Ph.D. in mathematics in 2010 after completing a doctoral dissertation, titled "Results in extremal and probabilistic combinatorics", under the supervision of Benny Sudakov.

In 2019, Loh developed an alternative to the usual derivation, algorithm and exposition of the solution of quadratic equations, which he believes is "practical for integration into all mainstream curricula".

Loh is the lead developer of a pandemic-response app named NOVID which utilizes a new way to mitigate the spread of contagious disease. Unlike contact-tracing apps, the user is notified before exposure rather than after. The user is told how many relationships away the disease is, where a relationship is defined by two people who spend time together in person.

References

External links 

 
 

1982 births
Living people
Carnegie Mellon University faculty
California Institute of Technology alumni
Alumni of the University of Cambridge
Princeton University alumni
21st-century American mathematicians
International Mathematical Olympiad participants
American people of Singaporean descent